NGC 3603-A1 (HD 97950A1) is a double-eclipsing binary star system located at the centre of the HD 97950 cluster in the NGC 3603 star-forming region, about 25,000 light years from Earth.  Both stars are of spectral type WN6h and among the most luminous and most massive known.

HD 97950 was catalogued as a star, but was known to be a dense cluster or close multiple star.  In 1926, the six brightest members were given letters from A to F, although several of them have since been resolved into more than one star.  Star A was first resolved into three components using speckle interferometry, although they can now be directly imaged using space-based or adaptive optics.  Component A1 was finally determined to be a spectroscopic binary.

The two component stars of NGC 3603-A1 circle each other every 3.77 days, and show brightness variations of about 0.3 magnitudes due to eclipses.  The stars orbit very close to each other, separated by barely their own diameters and at or near to filling their roche lobes.

This makes them the two most massive stars directly measured, i.e. with their masses determined (using Keplerian orbits), and not estimated from models.

Each component is a Wolf-Rayet (WR) star, with spectra dominated by strong broadened emission lines.  Type WN6 indicates that ionised nitrogen lines are strong in comparison to ionised carbon lines, and the suffix h indicates that hydrogen is also seen in the spectrum.  This type of WR star is not the classical stripped helium-burning aged star, but a young highly luminous object with CNO cycle fusion products showing at the surface due to strong conventional and rotational mixing, and high mass loss rates from the atmosphere.  The emission lines are generated in the stellar wind and the photosphere is completely hidden.  The surface fraction of hydrogen is still estimated to be 60-70%.

Although the stars are very young, around 1.5 million years old, they have already lost a considerable fraction of their initial masses.

References

External links
 
 NASA Image of the day
 Space Daily

Carina (constellation)
Wolf–Rayet stars
NGC 3603
097950A1
054948A1
Durchmusterung objects
Eclipsing binaries